Khezerabad (also Romanized as Kheẕerābād) is a village in Anguran Rural District, Anguran District, Mahneshan County, Zanjan Province, Iran. At the 2006 census, its population was 88, in 21 families.The mother tongue of people is Azerbaijani Turkish. Majority of the village's population immigrated to other cities around Zanjan or around Tehran in 1980s and 1990s. Some of the family names related to this village are Heidari, Hemmat Khanlou, and Mohammadi.

References 

Populated places in Mahneshan County